Sterling Ledet & Associates, Inc. is a chain of United States software training centers incorporated in the state of Georgia on August 29, 1996. The company is an authorized training provider for Adobe Systems, Quark, Inc., Autodesk, Microsoft, Unity Technologies and Apple Inc.

The company's focus is on instructor-led software training. The course catalog include graphics software for use in web, print, video, and multimedia publishing, engineering and architectural tools, web development tools and technology, and emerging VR/AR and mixed reality tools. It provides publicly scheduled open enrollment classes in cities in the United States, online instructor led training in virtual classrooms and privately scheduled, custom training at client locations. Classes are instructor-led, hands-on workshops typically two to five days in length. Ledet Training was the first authorized training provider in the US for Unity Technologies.

The headquarters of the company is in Atlanta, Georgia. One of the Denver training centers of the company was operated for Quark, Inc. The company has also operated training centers for Apple, and Enovation, a Fujifilm company. It is a member of the Adobe Solutions Network training center program.

Noteworthy instructors for the company include Dan Margulis, author of Professional Photoshop. The company principal and CEO is Sterling Ledet, a past board member of the Atlanta Chapter of Entrepreneurs' Organization.

References

External links
 Sterling Ledet & Associates, Inc. company website

Business services companies of the United States
Privately held companies based in Georgia (U.S. state)
Companies based in Atlanta